Birla Institute of Technology & Science, Pilani (Jhunjhunu) (BITS Pilani, Jhunjhunu) is a deemed university in Pilani, Jhunjhunu district, Rajasthan, India. It focuses primarily on higher education and research in engineering and sciences. After expansion to a campus in Dubai, it has become the first international deemed university, spearheading in science, engineering, management and research with five established campuses and 15 academic departments.

The institute is backed by the Aditya Birla Group and is one of the first six institutes to be awarded the Institute of Eminence status in 2018. BITS conducts the All-India computerized entrance examination, BITSAT (BITS Admission Test). Admission is purely assessed by the BITSAT examination. The fully residential institute is privately supported.

The institute was established in its present form in 1964. During this period, the institute's transformation from a regional engineering college to a national university was backed by G.D. Birla. The university has expanded its campuses from Pilani (Jhunjhunu) to Sancoale (South Goa), Hyderabad, Dubai and Mumbai. Through its highly successful and widespread alumni network spanning globally across varied fields, BITS Pilani has made a significant impact on corporates, academia, research, entrepreneurship, arts and social activism.

History

Inception 

The Birla Education Trust was founded in 1929; the intermediate college became a degree college and later offered postgraduate courses. The masters programme in electronics began in 1955.

Reacting to early criticism about the project, contemporary advisor Thomas Drew said:

BITS Pilani became a deemed university established under Section 3 of the UGC Act, 1956 by notification No. F.12-23/63.U-2 of 18 June 1964. In its formative years, the Institute tied up with the Massachusetts Institute of Technology (MIT), Boston, USA.  It adopted semester system, modular structure of courses, continuous and internal evaluation, letter grading and the likes.  It also created linkages with the industries which yielded structured “Practice School” as an integral component of education.

In 1964, the Birla Colleges of Humanities, Commerce, Engineering, Pharmacy and Science were merged to form the Birla Institute of Technology & Science. The board provided direction in developing a curriculum, selecting equipment, upgrading the library and recruiting (and training) an Indian faculty. To quicken the pace of reform he convinced C. R. Mitra to be the new director of the institute. Mitra advocated a "practice school" internship program as a requirement for faculty and students. The Practice School Program is still a requirement for students in BITS.

According to Robert Kargon and Stuart Leslie:

The acceptance rate of BITS Pilani is 1.47% based on the data of BITSAT 2012.

Like Berkeley, BITS Pilani has also experienced student activism. BITS Pilani had to be shut down multiple times because of student strikes during 1973, 1980, and 1985.

Multi-campus expansion 

In 1999, enrollment expanded from 2,500 to 4,000 and campuses were founded in Dubai (2000) and Goa (2004). Upon invitation by the Government of Andhra Pradesh, BITS Pilani acquired  of land from the Andhra Pradesh government through the Hyderabad Urban Development Authority for a new constituent campus in 2006. The land is located in Jawaharnagar, Shameerpet Mandal in the Rangareddy district. The BITS Pilani Hyderabad campus opened in 2008; the school also has a virtual university and an extension center in Bangalore. BITS School of Management (BITSoM) was established in January 2021 and offers a 2-year full time residential MBA. BITSoM  has its interim campus in Hiranandani Knowledge Park, Powai, Mumbai while the 60-acre permanent campus is being set up in  the Mumbai Metropolitan Region.

Chancellor and academic head 
BITS Pilani has a tradition of long-serving chancellors and vice-chancellors. Its founder, G.D. Birla, was chancellor from the college's inception until his death in 1983. He was followed by his son, Krishna Kumar Birla, who was chancellor until his death in 2008. Currently, Kumar Mangalam Birla is chancellor and Shobhana Bhartia is pro-chancellor.

The first academic head of the institution was J. C. Stracliff (Principal) and V. Lakshminarayanan (Vice-Principal) for a period of 3 years during 1946–1949. V. Lakshminarayan became Principal of Birla Engineering College in 1949 (served from 1946 to 1963 in Birla Engineering College), then becoming the first director of BITS-Pilani in 1964 when it was formed and served until 1969. He was succeeded by BITS directors C.R. Mitra (1969–1989) and S. Venkateswaran (1989–2006). "director" denoted the head of a campus.

In April 2016, Chancellor Kumar Mangalam Birla announced that Prof. Souvik Bhattacharya of IIT Kharagpur / Jadavpur University was selected to take over as the new Vice chancellor of BITS Pilani. He took over in June 2016 to become the 6th academic head of the institute. Prof. Ranendra N. Saha became Acting Vice Chancellor since June 13, 2021 after the expiration of Prof. Bhattacharya's term.

Campuses

Pilani campus 

The Pilani campus has India's first technological museum, the Birla Museum. Built in 1954, it showcases technological achievements.
BITS has a  auditorium decorated with paintings by students from the department of art and decoration.

BITS has a Sharda Peeth dedicated to the goddess Saraswati, Sharda Peeth, built by G. D. Birla. The white marble temple is built on a -high foundation, with 70 pillars for support.

Residential and dining facilities 
The institute has fourteen hostels in total. Each hostel is referred as a "Bhawan", the Sanskrit word for hostel. Thirteen of them – Krishna Bhawan, Vishwakarma Bhawan, Rana Pratap Bhawan, Bhagirath Bhawan, Ashok Bhawan, Gandhi Bhawan, Shankar Bhawan, Vyas Bhawan, Budh Bhawan, Ram Bhawan, Pandit Madan Mohan Malviya Bhawan, CV Raman Bhavan and Srinivasa Ramanujan Bhawan are for male students. There is a single hostel for female students called Meera Bhawan. The institute also has one more hostel for parents and guests The hostels are named after saints, scientists, and historical and religious figures.

Every two hostels share a mess hall except Meera Bhawan, Srinivasa Ramanujan Bhawan and Sir C V RAMAN Bhawan which have their own mess halls. All dining areas are student-managed. Students may also eat at a "Redi" (a small canteen near every hostel), Institute Canteen (IC), the All-Night Canteen (ANC) and the Student Activity Centre (SAC) cafeteria (Talk of the town and Mr. Idli), LOOTERS . The ANC is also student-managed. Moreover, there is a small area inside campus called "Connaught" which has many restaurants, cafes, etc. and has shops for general daily needs as well.

Vision 2020, Mission 2012 
In 2010 the institute launched a renewal project, "Vision 2020, Mission 2012," to identify and implement measures establishing BITS Pilani as one of India's top three research-led universities by 2015 and among the leading 25 technical universities in Asia by 2020. As a part of this initiative, Kumar Mangalam Birla visited the Pilani campus on 13 November 2011 with pro-chancellor Shobhana Bhartia  and other members of the board of governors. At this meeting, Birla announced a Rs. 600 crore fund for renovation and construction of new academic buildings and student hostels on the Pilani campus. The project was planned for completion in 2014.

Academics

Academic programmes 
The institute has a three-tier academic structure.

First degrees 
BITS Pilani offers four-year integrated first-degree programs (so called because several courses, involving mathematics and science, are common to each degree) in engineering, technology and pharmacy, and integrated Master of Science programs in science and technology.

BITS Pilani is noted for its unique Dual-Degree program, wherein students are allowed to pursue two degrees, namely a Masters in Science (as determined by their BITSAT score or their first-year performance) and a Bachelors in Engineering (as determined by their performance in their first-year) simultaneously for a time duration of five-years, a program that is unique to a top-level university in India. The dual-degree program is part of the first-degree programs and is offered to students taking the BITSAT examination.

Master's Degrees 
BITS Pilani offers master's in engineering, pharmacy, public health and business administration.

Doctoral degrees 
BITS Pilani offers Ph.D. in engineering, pharmacy, natural sciences, public health and business administration.

Off-campus program [WILP]
BITS Pilani offers off-campus program (WILP) in which students receive work experience in industry. Enrollment has increased from 30 in 1979 to over 10,000 in 2005. More than 19,500 students were registered in off-campus Work Integrated Learning Program (WILP) in 2008–09.

Admission

Pilani, Goa and Hyderabad campuses 
Before 2005, admissions were based on the candidates' score in the 12th board examination. Earlier many students used to switch to State board schools for their 12th standard, in order to grab more marks easily and gain admission at BITS Pilani. BITS had been moderating marks from various school boards since 1982.

Since 2005, admission to BITS has been offered on the basis of the student's performance in the all-India entrance examination, the Birla Institute of Technology and Science Admission Test (BITSAT). For foreign students, BITS has a separate admission scheme called International Student Admissions (ISA) category. To gauge the merit of these ISA students, BITS accepts the SAT and SAT Subject Tests in chemistry, physics, and Math 2C. BITSAT, for which applications are submitted in December, is conducted online in May and June in cities all over India. The exam tests the candidate's knowledge, reasoning and analytical abilities in physics, chemistry, mathematics, English and logical reasoning, and is based on higher secondary curricula in India and abroad. A 2012 news report showed that BITSAT had become more competitive than the IIT-JEE, in terms of the ratio of the number of aspirants to the number of seats available.

Dubai campus 

Admission to Birla Institute of Technology and Science, Pilani – Dubai Campus is based on scores in the 12th standard qualifying exam along with BITSAT. Although the BITS Pilani-Dubai campus was established for the educational requirements of the Gulf Cooperation Council countries, admission is open to students of all nationalities.

International projects 
BITS Pilani is a partner in developing the JournalServer open-access digital library, Project IPV6 and the  initiative.

Rankings 

Internationally, BITS Pilani was ranked 1001–1200 in the QS World University Rankings for 2023 and 188 in Asia. It was ranked 801–1000 in the world by the Times Higher Education World University Rankings for 2023, 251–300 in Asia in 2022 and 301–350 among emerging economies.

In India, BITS Pilani was ranked 27 overall in 2020 by the National Institutional Ranking Framework (NIRF), 15 among universities, 30 in the engineering ranking and 6 in India in the pharmacy ranking. It was ranked 7th among engineering colleges by India Today in 2020 and second among private engineering colleges by Outlook India in 2022.

The Department of Management was ranked 10 among private management schools in India by Outlook India in 2020.

Student life

Events

OASIS 

Oasis is the annual cultural festival of the BITS, Pilani. It hosts a variety of events in various categories like dance, drama, literature, comedy, fashion and music.

BOSM 

BOSM (BITS-Pilani Open Sports Meet) is the annual sports competition at the Pilani campus. BITS-Pilani invites colleges throughout India to participate in events including carrom board, hockey, cricket, basketball, football, volleyball, track and field, badminton, tennis, table tennis, squash and weightlifting. Since its 2010 silver jubilee (25th) anniversary, BOSM has invited a team from Moratuwa University in Sri Lanka.

APOGEE 
APOGEE (A Professions Oriented Gathering over Educational Experiences) is an international annual technical festival at the Pilani campus. Since its inception in 1983, APOGEE has hosted students and researchers from across the country. The guest lecture series of the fest, Think Again Conclave has received eminent speakers in the past which include A.P.J. Abdul Kalam, Richard Stallman, Jimmy Wales, Kailash Satyarthi, Walter Lewin and A. S. Kiran Kumar. Other events include the Paper Presentation Event, which is one of the oldest research paper presentation platforms in the country, and Project Presentation, which exhibits over 550 projects in various fields of science and engineering.

Spark 
BITS Spark programme was launched in 2012. The programme promotes entrepreneurship courses and workshops, offers mentorship, and provides angel funds.

Alumni 

The BITS Alumni Association is an international organisation with chapters throughout the world, connecting alumni in networking, social events and fundraising.

See also 
 Conquest (Start-up Challenge)

References

External links 

 

 01
Institutes of Eminence
Universities and colleges in Rajasthan
Business schools in Rajasthan
Engineering colleges in Rajasthan
Deemed universities in India
Deemed universities in Rajasthan
Education in Jhunjhunu district
1964 establishments in Rajasthan
Educational institutions established in 1964